Sigbjørn Larsen (born 18 July 1936) is a Norwegian politician for the Christian Democratic Party.

He served as a deputy representative in the Norwegian Parliament from Sør-Trøndelag during the terms 1981–1985 and 1993–1997.

On the local level Larsen was mayor of Frøya municipality from 1979 to 1987.

References

1936 births
Living people
Christian Democratic Party (Norway) politicians
Deputy members of the Storting
Mayors of Frøya, Sør-Trøndelag
20th-century Norwegian politicians